The 2019–20 Dayton Flyers men's basketball team represented the University of Dayton during the 2019–20 NCAA Division I men's basketball season. The Flyers were led by third-year head coach Anthony Grant and played their home games at the University of Dayton Arena as members of the Atlantic 10 Conference.

The Flyers finished the season with an overall record of 29–2 and were undefeated regular season champions of the Atlantic 10. Grant was named consensus national coach of the year while sophomore Obi Toppin became Dayton's first consensus first-team All-American and earned the majority of major college player of the year awards, including the Naismith College Player of the Year and the John R. Wooden Award. The season was cut short due to the COVID-19 pandemic prior to the Flyers’ first game of the Atlantic 10 tournament. They finished ranked third in both major polls, their highest ranking in a major media poll since the Don Donoher era.

Previous season
The Flyers finished the 2018–19 season 21–12, 13–5 in A-10 play to finish in third place. They lost in the quarterfinals of the A-10 tournament to Saint Louis. They received an at-large bid to the NIT where they lost in the first round to Colorado.

Offseason

Departures

Incoming transfers

Recruiting class of 2019

Recruiting class of 2020

Roster

Schedule and results

|-
!colspan=9 style=| Exhibition

|-
!colspan=9 style=| Non-conference regular season

|-
!colspan=9 style=|Atlantic 10 regular season

|-
!colspan=9 style=|Atlantic 10 tournament

Source

Rankings

*AP does not release post-NCAA Tournament rankings

References

Dayton Flyers Men's
Dayton Flyers men's basketball seasons
Dayton
Dayton